Edward Linggu Bukut is a Malaysian politician from STAR. He has been the Secretary-general of STAR since 2021. He was also the Member of Sabah State Legislative Assembly for Tamparuli from 1999 to 2004.

Politics 
In 2001, he quitted PBS to join PBRS together with Jeffrey Kitingan. Then, he joined STAR and become the Vice president before being appointed as the Secretary-general and also Strategy Director of the party. He had also participated in the 2013 Sabah state election, contesting for the Tamparuli state seat but lost.

Election result

References 

Living people
21st-century Malaysian politicians
1979 births